Kim Yong-Gi (born August 1, 1989) is a South Korean football player.

References

External links

1989 births
Living people
Association football defenders
South Korean footballers
South Korean expatriate footballers
J2 League players
Mito HollyHock players
Expatriate footballers in Japan
South Korean expatriate sportspeople in Japan